ICC World Cricket League Division Six was part of the World Cricket League (WCL) system, but was abolished after the 2015 tournament. Like all other divisions, it was contested as a standalone tournament rather than as an actual league. 

The inaugural Division Six tournament was held in 2009, hosted by Singapore, and featured six teams. The next two tournaments (in 2011 and 2013) featured the same number, which was increased to eight for the 2015 tournament. Because the WCL operates on a system of promotion and relegation, teams have generally only participated in one or two Division Six tournaments before being either promoted to Division Five, relegated to Division Seven (2009 and 2011), or relegated to regional competitions (2013 and 2015). Overall, 15 teams have played in at least one Division Six tournament, with Guernsey featuring three times (more than any other team). Malaysia and Singapore, which began in Division Six in 2009, have since progressed to Division Three.

Results

Performance by team
Legend
 – Champions
 – Runners-up
 – Third place
Q – Qualified
    — Hosts

 Note: at every edition of the tournament, the teams finishing first and second have been promoted to Division Five.

Player statistics

References

Division 6